Javier Restrepo (born 14 February 1953) is a Colombian former professional tennis player.

Born and raised in Medellín, Restrepo was a left-handed player and reached a career best singles world ranking of 203, while also featuring in four Davis Cup ties for Colombia.

Restrepo made his only grand slam main draw appearance at the 1981 French Open and had a win in qualifying over Mats Wilander, who the following year would claim the title.

Since the early 1980s he has been based in Rio de Janeiro as a tennis coach.

References

External links
 
 
 

1953 births
Living people
Colombian male tennis players
Colombian expatriates in Brazil
Sportspeople from Medellín
20th-century Colombian people